Kentucky Dam Village State Resort Park is a Kentucky state park located on the northern shore of Kentucky Lake in Marshall County. The park encompasses  and is one of the state's more popular resort parks. The park features a convention center, 18-hole golf course, and lighted runway for light aircraft.

The park received an upgraded rating from two diamonds to three diamonds from the American Automobile Association (AAA) in 2007. Cumberland Falls State Resort Park also received the upgraded rating. The two facilities were the first state resort parks to achieve the three-diamond rating following AAA's revision of its rating system in 2001.

References

External links
 

State parks of Kentucky
Protected areas of Marshall County, Kentucky
Protected areas established in 1949
1949 establishments in Kentucky